Attiégouakro Department is a department of Ivory Coast. It is one of two departments in the Yamoussoukro Autonomous District.

Population and sub-prefectures
In the 2021 census, Attiégouakro Department had a population of 49,513. The department is divided into two sub-prefectures, Attiégouakro and Lolobo.

History
Attiégouakro Department was created as in 2009 as a second-level subdivision when Lac Region's Yamoussoukro Department was divided in two.

In 2011, districts were introduced as new first-level subdivisions of Ivory Coast. At the same time, regions were reorganised and became second-level subdivisions and all departments were converted into third-level subdivisions. At this time, Attiégouakro Department became part of Yamoussoukro Autonomous District, one of two districts in the country with no regions.

Notes

Departments of Yamoussoukro
2009 establishments in Ivory Coast
States and territories established in 2009